Leo Laakso (21 August 1918 in Heinola – 4 April 2002) was a Finnish ski jumper who competed in the 1940s. He finished 6th in the individual large hill competition at the 1948 Winter Olympics in St. Moritz.

External links
Individual large hill results 1948-60
Leo Laakso's profile at Sports Reference.com

1918 births
2002 deaths
People from Heinola
Finnish male ski jumpers
Ski jumpers at the 1948 Winter Olympics
Sportspeople from Päijät-Häme
20th-century Finnish people